Montrose is a town in Jasper County, Mississippi, United States. The population was 140 at the 2010 census.

Geography
Montrose is located in northwestern Jasper County at  (32.124254, -89.235657), in the southeastern corner of Bienville National Forest. Mississippi Highway 15 passes through the town, leading southwest  to Bay Springs, the county seat, and northeast  to Newton.

Demographics

As of the census of 2000, there were 127 people, 51 households, and 37 families residing in the town. The population density was 46.7 people per square mile (18.0/km). There were 73 housing units at an average density of 26.8 per square mile (10.4/km). The racial makeup of the town was 86.61% White, 12.60% African American and 0.79% Native American. Hispanic or Latino of any race were 2.36% of the population.

There were 51 households, out of which 27.5% had children under the age of 18 living with them, 60.8% were married couples living together, 3.9% had a female householder with no husband present, and 25.5% were non-families. 25.5% of all households were made up of individuals, and 23.5% had someone living alone who was 65 years of age or older. The average household size was 2.49 and the average family size was 2.97.

In the town, the population was spread out, with 24.4% under the age of 18, 11.0% from 18 to 24, 22.8% from 25 to 44, 21.3% from 45 to 64, and 20.5% who were 65 years of age or older. The median age was 39 years. For every 100 females, there were 104.8 males. For every 100 females age 18 and over, there were 92.0 males.

The median income for a household in the town was $29,792, and the median income for a family was $36,667. Males had a median income of $26,484 versus $25,000 for females. The per capita income for the town was $14,016. There were 11.5% of families and 11.4% of the population living below the poverty line, including 9.8% of under eighteens and 17.6% of those over 64.

Education
Montrose is served by the West Jasper School District. Its comprehensive high school is Bay Springs High School.

Climate
The climate in this area is characterized by hot, humid summers and generally mild to cool winters.  According to the Köppen Climate Classification system, Montrose has a humid subtropical climate, abbreviated "Cfa" on climate maps.

References

Towns in Jasper County, Mississippi
Towns in Mississippi
Towns in Laurel micropolitan area